Janet Edeme is a Nigerian agricultural scientist and plant biologist, who works as the Director of the Department of Rural Economy and Agriculture at the African Union Commission (AUC/DREA), based in Addis Ababa, Ethiopia. AUC/DREA is a department within the African Union, responsible for promoting sustainable rural development through agriculture and the improvement of food security across the African continent.

Background and education
Edeme is a Nigerian national who was born, raised and educated in her home country. She holds a Master of Science degree in Agricultural Biology, specializing in Plant Pathology, awarded by the University of Ibadan. Her Doctor of Philosophy degree was jointly awarded by Ibadan University, the Texas A&M University, in College Station, Texas, United States and the International Institute for Tropical Agriculture (IITA), in Ibadan.

Work experience
Edeme's work and research focuses on the field of agricultural science. She carried out post-doctoral research at the International Livestock Research Institute (ILRI), in Nairobi, Kenya. She lectured at her alma mater, the University of Ibadan. She has also served as a consultant to intentional organisations, including the Joint United Nations Programme on HIV/AIDS (UNAIDS) and the Food and Agricultural Organisation of the United Nations (FAO).

Other considerations
Edeme is a member of the Governing Board of AfricaSeeds, the inter-government agency, within the African Union, that is responsible for implementing the African Seed and Biotechnology Programme.

See also
 Mary Mgonja
 Irene Tarimo
 Ada Osakwe
 Josephine Okot
 Amy Jadesimi

References

External links
Website of the African Union Commission

Living people
Year of birth missing (living people)
Nigerian scientists
Nigerian biologists
Nigerian women scientists
Nigerian women biologists
University of Ibadan alumni
Texas A&M University alumni